John Norwich may refer to:

 John Julius Norwich, 2nd Viscount Norwich, (1929-2018), English historian, travel writer and television personality
Sir John Norwich, 1st Baronet (1613 – 1661), MP